The Giorgio Quazza Medal is an award given by the International Federation of Automatic Control (IFAC) to a distinguished control engineer, presented at each IFAC Triennial International World Congress. It was established in 1979, as a memorial to the late Giorgio Quazza, a leading Italian electrical and control engineer who served IFAC in many capacities in a most distinguished manner. The award is given for "outstanding lifetime contributions of a researcher and/or engineer to conceptual foundations in the field of systems and control."

Recipients

 1981: John F. Coales
 1984: 
 1987: Karl J. Åström
 1990: Petar V. Kokotovic
 1993: Edward J. Davison
 1996: Alberto Isidori
 1999: Brian D. O. Anderson
 2002: Lennart Ljung
 2005: Tamer Basar
 2008: Graham Goodwin
 2011: 
 2014: David Mayne
 2017: Roger Brockett
 2020: W. Murray Wonham
 2023: A. Stephen Morse

See also

 List of people in systems and control
 List of engineering awards
 IEEE Control Systems Award
 Hendrik W. Bode Lecture Prize
 Richard E. Bellman Control Heritage Award
 Rufus Oldenburger Medal

References

Systems sciences awards